The following is a list of episodes from the 2017 series Wacky Races.

Series overview

List of episodes

Season 1 (2017–18)

Season 2 (2018–19)

References

External links

Wacky Races
Wacky Races
Lists of Cartoon Network television series episodes